Clemens Ganz (born 18 January 1935 in Nohfelden) is a German organist.

Ganz studied with Hermann Schroeder and Josef Zimmermann church music and school music at the Hochschule für Musik in Cologne (A-examination). From 1964–1976 he was cantor at St. Marien in Köln-Kalk. From 1971–1998 he taught as professor at the Hochschule für Musik. From 1985–2001 he was organist of Cologne Cathedral.

Discography
 Hermann Schroeder: Sechs Orgelchoräle über altdeutsche geistliche Volkslieder op. 11
 Hermann Schroeder: Vier Choralvorspiele
 Die neue Schwalbennestorgel im Kölner Dom
 Die Klais-Orgeln im Kölner Dom
 Orgeln in Köln
 Musik am Hohen Dom zu Köln
 Freu dich Erd und Sternenzelt : festliche Advents- und Weihnachtsmusik

References

1935 births
Living people
German classical organists
German male organists
Organ improvisers
Musicians from Cologne
Hochschule für Musik und Tanz Köln alumni
Academic staff of the Hochschule für Musik und Tanz Köln
21st-century organists
21st-century male musicians
Male classical organists